The Tarlac class are landing platform docks of the Philippine Navy meant for amphibious operations and transport duties in support of the Armed Forces of the Philippines. The class was initially called the "Strategic Sealift Vessel" before being formally named. The ships will also double as a support platform for Humanitarian and Disaster Relief (HADR) and Search & Rescue (SAR) operations.

Two ships were constructed by the PT PAL Indonesia based on the Indonesian Navy's . Construction of the first unit already started in January 2015 and was delivered in July 2016, while the second unit started a few months after and delivered by 2017 after going through sea trials. The second ship was delivered on 10 May 2017 and named as BRP Davao del Sur.

The Philippine Navy has reported in June 2022 that a future version of the Tarlac-class was ordered.

History
The original strategic sealift vessel project was based on a proposal to acquire a converted Ro-Ro (Roll On – Roll Off) vessel from Japan as recommended by the Center of Naval Leadership & Excellence in 2009. Purchase and technical assistance was to be provided by the DBP Maritime Leasing Corporation Inc. (DMLC). It was one of the priority items in the wish list for purchase between 2012 and 2016 presented by the armed forces to the House of Representatives' committee on national defense and security on 26 January 2011. But this project did not push through due to delays in budget allocation and with the ship being offered and sold to another buyer.

Initially a separate project from the Strategic Sealift Vessel, the Department of National Defense (DND) was rushing the acquisition of one or two multi-role vessels (MRV) for the Philippine Navy through government-to-government contract at a cost of 5 to 10 billion pesos. Initially the reported source of the said ships is either South Korea or Singapore. Previous statements and news reports indicate that the multi-role vessels are comparable to landing platform docks operated by foreign navies like the Singaporean  or the Spanish . It was later confirmed that the ship would be from South Korea and is a variant of the Indonesian Navy (TNI-AL) Makassar-class LPD, and is packaged with four units Samsung Techwin KAAV-7 amphibious assault vehicles (AAV), two units Daesun  landing craft utility LCU-23, four units of  rigid-hulled inflatable boats, one unit truck-based mobile hospital, two units Kia KM-250 2-ton troop trucks, two units Kia KM-450 1-ton troop trucks, two units Kia KM-450 ambulances, two units Kia Retona -ton utility vehicles, and one unit forklift/cargo handling equipment.

In May 2011, reports surfaced on the possible acquisition of three landing platform docks from Indonesian shipbuilder PT PAL. This would be of indigenous design and will have no resemblance to the previously constructed model for the Indonesian Navy, the Makassar class, which was of South Korean origin. This would represent another option as South Korea has been reportedly pushing for the sale of at least one platform based on the Indonesian Navy Makassar class. As of December 2011, the Philippine Navy was cleared to start negotiations for the ship/s from any friendly nations with a budget of Php 5 billion.

With the cancellation of the original SSV project, the two projects were combined as the strategic sealift vessel, based on the original multi-role vessel parameters and requirements. Based on the "Philippine Fleet Desired Force Mix" strategy concept publicly released in May 2012, the Philippine Navy requires at least four strategic sealift vessels to be available by 2020.

On 24 May 2013, the DND announced the proposed acquisition of two service support vessels (SSVs) worth P2 billion each, describing the ships as vessels smaller than the original MRV requirement but still capable of moving a battalion of troops with their armored vehicle complement, and equipped with helipad and a platform for search and rescue operations which could be fitted with hospital facilities. On 29 August 2013, the DND declared PT PAL of Indonesia as the winner of the two SSVs and considered as the "lone eligible bidder" with a bid price of Php 3,963,999,520.00. Other firms bought bid documents but never pursued their interest in the actual bidding procedures.

Design
The design is closely based on the Makassar class of Landing Platform Dock used by the Indonesian Navy, which in turn were actually based on a low-cost LPD design from Korean shipbuilder Daewoo Shipbuilding and Marine Engineering / Daesun Shipyard.

Communication equipment
The communication equipment is supplied by the Portuguese company EID Naval Communications, specifically the ICCS5 communications control system, and Harris RF Communications VLF-HF and V/UHF radios.

Propulsion
The ships have a Combined Diesel and Diesel (CODAD) layout and will be using similar engines as those used by their Indonesian counterparts, the MAN 9L28/32A medium speed engines. Combined power from the two engines will produce  transferred to two controllable pitch propellers.

Armaments
PT PAL confirmed that the SSVs will be designed to support one  (3 in) main gun on the foredeck. Two stern-facing  secondary guns will also be fitted, one each on the port and starboard sides. The weapons systems are supposed to be installed separately by the Philippine Navy after delivery. As of 25 October 2019, both vessels are only armed with six manually operated .50-caliber machine guns.

Flight support
Originally, the ships were designed to accommodate two medium-sized (10-ton) helicopters on the hangar as well as the flight deck, with the specifications emphasizing the US-made Sikorsky Black Hawk helicopter as basis. But changes in the Philippine Navy's requirement later on changed the design to have a hangar for one medium (10-ton) helicopter and a flight deck for two medium (10-ton) helicopters.

Construction
SSV-1 officially started its construction on 22 January 2015 where a first steel cutting ceremony was held in PT PAL's facility in Surabaya, Indonesia. Further works and testing will be made until the ship is delivered to the Philippine Navy by May 2016.

The second ship, SSV-2, undertook its first steel cutting ceremonies on 5 June 2015 in PT PAL's Surabaya shipyard. Its keel laying ceremony was held together with the launching of the lead ship on 18 January 2016, and was given a hull number LD-602. The ship reached Manila on 8 May 2017 and was accorded a formal welcome ceremony on 10 May 2017.

Ships of class

See also
 List of naval ship classes in service
 List of equipment of the Philippine Navy

References

Ships of the Philippine Navy
Amphibious warfare vessel classes